Predanovci (in older sources also Bradanovci) is a roadside village in the Municipality of Puconci in the Prekmurje region of Slovenia.

References

External links

Predanovci on Geopedia

Populated places in the Municipality of Puconci